The East Riding County League is a football competition based in England. It has a total of six divisions including the East Riding County League Premier Division which sits at level 13 of the English football league system and is a feeder to the Humber Premier League. For the 2018–19 season, the league decided to operate with just six divisions, losing division six and merging the remaining teams from that division to the remaining divisions.

Member clubs 2019–20

Premier Division

Division One

Division Two

Division Three

Division Four

Division Five

Champions
Premier Division
2008–09 – Howden Amateurs
2009–10 – Hodgsons
2010–11 – Driffield Evening Institute
2011–12 – Little Weighton
2012–13 – Wawne United
2013–14 – AFC Rovers
2014–15 – Wawne United Reserves
2015–16 – Bridlington Town Reserves
2016–17 – North Ferriby United Academy
2017–18 – Beverley Town Reserves
2018–19 – Reckitts Reserves
2019-20 - Season abandoned due to COVID-19 pandemic

 Division One
2008–09 – Beverley Town Reserves
2009–10 – AFC Rovers
2010–11 – Little Weighton
2011–12 – Bridlington Town Academy
2012–13 – Wawne United Reserves
2013–14 – Gilberdyke Phoenix
2014–15 – Bridlington Albion
2015–16 – AFC Orchard
2016–17 – Queens County
2017–18 – Harchester United
2018–19 – West Hull Amateurs
2019-20 - Season abandoned due to COVID-19 pandemic

 Division Two
2008–09 – Trades and Labour Club
2009–10 – Hedon Rangers Reserves 
2010–11 – Wawne United Reserves
2011–12 – Haltemprice Rangers
2012–13 – Leven Members Club
2013–14 – Lord Nelson
2014–15 – West Hull Amateurs 
2015–16 – Hutton Cranswick SRA     
2016–17 – Harchester United
2017–18 – Reckitts Reserves
2018–19 – Hessle Rangers Reserves
2019-20 - Season abandoned due to COVID-19 pandemic

 Division Three
2008–09 – Cliffe 
2009–10 – Wawne United Reserves
2010–11 – Haltemprice Rangers
2011–12 – Viking Raiders Reserves
2012–13 – Middleton Rovers
2013–14 – Newland St John's
2014–15 – Hutton Cranswick SRA
2015–16 – AFC North     
2016–17 – AFC Gulls
2017–18 – Apollo Rangers
2018–19 – Chaos United
2019-20 - Season abandoned due to COVID-19 pandemic

Division Four
2008–09 – Waterloo
2009–10 – Haltemprice Rangers 
2010–11 – Market Weighton United Reserves
2011–12 – Skirlaugh Reserves
2012–13 – FC Ridings
2013–14 – Gilberdyke Phoenix Reserves
2014–15 – Waterloo
2015–16 – Withernsea     
2016–17 – Hedon Rangers Thirds
2017–18 – Hessle Rangers Reserves
2018–19 – AFC Gulls
2019-20 - Season abandoned due to COVID-19 pandemic

Division Five
2008–09 – Haltemprice Rangers 
2009–10 – AFC Woodlands Reserves
2010–11 – Long Riston Thirds
2011–12 – Easington United Casuals
2012–13 – Bluebell Nafferton
2013–14 – Market Weighton United
2014–15 – Wawne United Fourths
2015–16 – Hedon Rangers Thirds
2016–17 – Patrington
2017–18 – Chaos United
2018–19 – Souths AFC 
2019-20 - Season abandoned due to COVID-19 pandemic

Division Six
2012–13 – Waterloo
2013–14 – No Division
2014–15 – No Division
2015–16 – Brandesburton Reserves 
2016–17 – Marist Rovers
2017–18 – South Park Academy

References

External links
East Riding County League – Official website
East Riding FA – Official website

 
Football in the East Riding of Yorkshire
Football leagues in England
Sports leagues established in 1902
1902 establishments in England